Palpomyia is a genus of flies belonging to the family Ceratopogonidae.

The genus has cosmopolitan distribution.

Species:
 Palpomyia abdominalis Kieffer, 1921 
 Palpomyia aculeata Ingram & Macfie, 1931

References

Ceratopogonidae